Cymbula is a genus of sea snails, the true limpets, marine gastropod mollusks in the family Patellidae.

Species
Species within the genus Cymbula include:

 Cymbula adansonii (Dunker, 1853)
 Cymbula canescens (Gmelin, 1791)
 Cymbula compressa (Linnaeus, 1758)
 Cymbula depsta (Reeve, 1855)
 Cymbula granatina (Linnaeus, 1758)
 Cymbula miniata (Born, 1778)
 Cymbula oculus (Born, 1778)
 Cymbula safiana (Lamarck, 1819)
 Cymbula sanguinans (Reeve, 1854) 
Species brought into synonymy
 Cymbula nigra (da Costa, 1771): synonym of Cymbula safiana (Lamarck, 1819)

References

 Vaught, K.C. (1989). A classification of the living Mollusca. American Malacologists: Melbourne, FL (USA). . XII, 195 pp.

External links
 Adams H. & Adams A. (1853-1858). The genera of Recent Mollusca; arranged according to their organization. London, van Voorst. Vol. 1: xl + 484 pp.; vol. 2: 661 pp.; vol. 3: 138 pls. [Published in parts: Vol. 1: i-xl (1858), 1-256 (1853), 257-484 (1854). Vol. 2: 1-92 (1854), 93-284 (1855), 285-412 (1856), 413-540 (1857), 541-661 (1858). Vol. 3: pl. 1-32 (1853), 33-96 (1855), 97-112 (1856), 113-128 (1857), 129-138 (1858) ]
 Pallary P. (1920). Exploration scientifique du Maroc organisée par la Société de Géographie de Paris et continuée par la Société des Sciences Naturelles du Maroc. Deuxième fascicule. Malacologie (1912). Larose, Rabat et Paris pp. 108, 1 pl., 1 map
 Branch, G. M. (2002). Two Oceans. 5th impression. David Philip, Cate Town & Johannesburg

Patellidae
Gastropod genera
Taxa named by Arthur Adams (zoologist)
Taxa named by Henry Adams (zoologist)